The Lin Zexu Memorial Museum of Macau is a museum in Nossa Senhora de Fátima, Macau, China about Lin Zexu's arrival in Macau on 3 September 1839.

History
The museum was completed in November 1997. In June 2017, the museum became part of the area where the Macau International Industrial Technology Development Association launched a Wi-Fi hotspot.

Architecture
The museum exhibition areas consists of Ban on Opium Trade and Inspection of Macao, Everlasting Memorials, Eyes Opened to the World and Macao before the Inspection Tour.

Exhibitions
The museum exhibits various photography of history during Lin Zexu period.

See also
 List of museums in Macau

References

1997 establishments in Macau
Macau Peninsula
Museums established in 1997
Museums in Macau